Ropica marmorata is a species of beetle in the family Cerambycidae. It was described by Breuning in 1939. It contains the subspecies Ropica marmorata marmorata and Ropica marmorata sarawakiana.

References

marmorata
Beetles described in 1939